Robert John Bailey (born 28 October 1963) is an English cricket umpire and former player who appeared in four Tests and four One Day Internationals from 1985 to 1990.

Playing career
He made his first-class debut for Northamptonshire in 1982 before being selected to represent England. He played his first one-day international in Sharjah in 1985, and was called up for a Test debut as part of an inexperienced batting line up against the formidable West Indies attack of 1988. He did well enough in the match at the Oval - making what remained his highest Test score in his first innings - and a subsequent one-day international against Sri Lanka to win selection for the winter tour to India. This trip was however cancelled due to political reasons, as he and several members of the England squad had sporting links to apartheid South Africa. His form at the beginning of the 1989 season can only be considered as poor, returning in time for his selection to the 1989–90 West Indies tour. He had in the intervening period specifically passed up the opportunity to participate in the England 1989 Rebel Tour to South Africa, which led to the non-availability of a number of other batters. He was given his first game of the series against the West Indies in the third Test where he bagged a pair. After a shocking decision in the fourth Test, perhaps in part caused by pressure exerted by an appeal by then West Indies captain Viv Richards, he returned with a well made 42 in Antigua against what was fast, accurate and intimidating bowling. Nevertheless, Bailey failed to reach a half-century in eight Test innings, and after that Antigua match never played for England again, despite his consistent performances of the 1990s. Thanks to a statistical quirk and a couple of not out innings, he retains an unusually high one-day international batting average of 68.50, the third highest of all England batters as of 2022. 

Bailey is described by ESPNCricinfo as a loyal player and described by Michael Henderson as "one of the finest men to have played county cricket in the past 30 years", testament to his seventeen years at Northamptonshire before he left to join Derbyshire at the end of 1999 after his contract was not renewed by Northants. A highlight of his county career came when he won the 1992 Natwest Trophy with Northamptonshire, making 72 not out in the final.

Style
A courageous middle order batsman with a short backlift, Bailey hit the ball extremely hard, with shots all around the ground. Accompanied by this was his ability in the field, and as a part-time off spinner.

Umpiring career

His playing retirement came in 2001 after which he was appointed to join the ECB's Reserve List of Umpires. Subsequently, he is now on the ECB First Class Umpires list after being promoted for the 2006 season.

In January 2018, he was named as one of the seventeen on-field umpires for the 2018 Under-19 Cricket World Cup.

See also
 List of One Day International cricket umpires
 List of Twenty20 International cricket umpires

References

External links

1963 births
Living people
People from Biddulph
English cricketers
England Test cricketers
England One Day International cricketers
Northamptonshire cricketers
Northamptonshire cricket captains
Derbyshire cricketers
English One Day International cricket umpires
English Twenty20 International cricket umpires
Marylebone Cricket Club cricketers
Staffordshire cricketers
Test and County Cricket Board XI cricketers